Ghatlodia is one of the 182 Legislative Assembly constituencies of Gujarat state in India. It is part of Ahmedabad district and it came into existence after 2008 delimitation. It is a segment of Gandhinagar Lok Sabha constituency.

The constituency has given two Chief Ministers of Gujarat, Anandiben Patel and Bhupendrabhai Patel.

List of segments
This assembly seat represents the following segments,
 Ahmedabad City Taluka (Part) Villages – Tragad, Ghatlodiya (M), Memnagar (M).
 Daskroi Taluka (Part) Villages – Lapkaman, Lilapur, Khodiyar, Chharodi, Jagatpur, Hebatpur, Bhadaj, Shilaj, Chenpur, Oganaj, Ghuma, Sola, Bodakdev, Ambli, Gota (CT), Thaltej (CT), Bopal (CT).

Members of Legislative Assembly

Election results

2022

2017

2012

See also
 List of constituencies of the Gujarat Legislative Assembly
 Ahmedabad district
 Ghatlodiya

References

Assembly constituencies of Gujarat
Ahmedabad district